Kid Acne (real name Ed Bradbury, born 1978) is an artist, illustrator and hip-hop musician. He was born in Lilongwe, Malawi.

He grew up in Lutterworth, Leicestershire, and currently lives and works in Sheffield, South Yorkshire, England. He spent his formative years painting graffiti, creating fanzines and making limited run records on his own Invisible Spies imprint. His signature style has adorned products for leading brands such as Prada, Kenzo, Elle, Kid Robot, Brompton and Warp Records.

Discography

Albums
Rap Traffic (LP) / Invisible Spies 2001
Council Pop (LP) / Invisible Spies 2003
Romance Ain't Dead (LP) / Lex Records 2007
Have A Word (LP) / Lex Records 2019
Null And Void (LP) / Lewis Recordings 2021

EPs and singles
"Squirrel Hunters" (7") / Invisible Spies 2001
"Regarde Kid Acne" (7") / Invisible Spies 2002
"Radio Music" (12", Single) / Invisible Spies 2003
"Zub-Zub Rockers" (7", Single) / Electro Caramel 2003
"Reality Raps" EP (12", EP) / Invisible Spies 2004
"Eddy Fresh" (7", Single) / Lex Records, EMI Records 2007
"Eddy Fresh" (12") / Lex Records, EMI Records 2007
"Sliding Doors" (7") / Lex Records, EMI Records 2007
"Worst Luck" EP (7") / Lex Records 2007

Appears on
MONGRELS – Slingshots (7") / C U Next Tuesday 1997
Toah Dynamic – Hip-Hop Gymkhana (7") / C U Next Tuesday 1997
Invisible Spies (CD, Comp) / C U Next Tuesday Records 1998
Req – Car Paint Scheme (LP) / Style Mentorz / Skint Records 2000
Toah Dynamic – Movement (LP) / Invisible Spies 2000
Lexoleum Two (12", EP) Rap Dracula / Lex Records 2001
Lexample (CD) Radio Music / Lex Records 2002
MONGRELS – Fresh Arrangements (7") / Invisible Spies 2002
Toah Dynamic – Harvest Festival (7") / Invisible Spies 2002
Toah Dynamic – Son Of A Copper (7") / Invisible Spies 2002
Toah Dynamic – Cops Hate Our Love (LP) / Invisible Spies 2002
Abstract Funk Theory (2xLP, Comp) Ghosts With Teeth / Obsessive 2003
Suspect Files Vol 3 (CD, Comp) South Yorks / Suspect Packages 2004
Lexample (CD, Promo, Smplr) Eddy Fresh / Lex Records 2007
MONGRELS - Low Budget High Concept (10") / Invisible Spies 2015
MONGRELS - You Dig Raps? (7") / Invisible Spies 2015
Burgundy Blood Meets MONGRELS - (cassette EP) ...In The Pop Wilderness / Invisible Spies 2016
MONGRELS - Attack The Monolith (LP) / Invisible Spies 2016
MONGRELS - Attack The Megalith (EP) / Invisible Spies 2017
MONGRELS - Over Eggin' It (7") / Invisible Spies 2018
I Monster - The Living Dead / The Living Dead

Zebra Face

Zebra Face is a cartoon character created by Kid Acne and Supreme Vagabond Craftsman. He is a bombastic stripey horse with a hip-hop obsession and an insulin dependent sidekick. Zebra Face first appeared in a one-page comic strip in Kid Acne's 'Velcro Grass' fanzine in 1995. Generating mild interest amongst the UK fanzine scene at the time, Zebra Face then became a fanzine of his own before the duo began working on a book, which was self-published in 2001.
 
Zebra Face was made into a short animated series for Channel 4, broadcast in Autumn 2012.

Selected solo exhibitions
2021: ALL THAT & A BAG OF CHIPS / Stella Dore Gallery, St Leanards (UK)
2019: HAVE A WORD / S1 Artspace, Sheffield (UK)
2017: MARK MY WORDS / C.A.V.E Gallery, Los Angeles (US)
2015: DESTINED FOR GREATNESS / C.A.V.E Gallery, Los Angeles (US)
2015: RUMBLE IN THE JUMBLE / B&B Gallery, Sheffield (UK)
2014: THE RETURN / Galo Art Gallery, Turin (IT)
2014: STANDARD PRACTICE / B&B Gallery, Sheffield (UK)
2014: ADAPTATIONS / Graffiti Life Gallery, London (UK)
2012: DAMN STRAIGHT/ Inoperable Gallery, Vienna (AT)
2012: STAND & DELIVER / C.A.V.E Gallery, Los Angeles (US)
2011: CLOAK & DAGGER / Other Gallery, Beijing (CN)
2011: KILL YOUR DARLINGS / Millennium Gallery, Sheffield (UK)
2011: RHYTHM IS A DANCER / Stolen Space, London (UK)
2010: WHEN THE SMOKE CLEARS / Concrete Hermit, London (UK)
2010: DUST IN THE GIANT’S EYE / Electrik Sheep Gallery, Newcastle (UK)
2010: OIS’ EASY / Helmet Gallery, Munich (DE)
2009: SMOKE & MIRRORS / Stella Dore Gallery, London (UK)

References

External links
About – Kid Acne kidacne.com/about
[ Allmusic.com: Biography]
Discogs

English graffiti artists
People from Lutterworth
Musicians from Sheffield
Living people
English illustrators
English hip hop musicians
People from Lilongwe
Musicians from Leicestershire
Lex Records artists
1978 births